Henry Jacob Gatewood (born September 25, 1995) is an American professional baseball shortstop who is currently a free agent. He was drafted 41st overall in the 2014 Major League Baseball draft by the Milwaukee Brewers.

Career
Gatewood attended Clovis High School in Clovis, California. He was the winner of the junior Home Run Derby at Citi Field on July 15, 2013.

Milwaukee Brewers
Gatewood at one point was considered a potential top overall pick in the 2014 Major League Baseball draft. He ended up getting drafted by the Milwaukee Brewers 41st overall in the draft. He signed on June 14, and was assigned to the AZL Brewers, where he posted a .206 batting average with three home runs and 32 RBIs in 50 games. Gatewood spent 2015 with both the Wisconsin Timber Rattlers and the Helena Brewers, batting a combined .244 with ten home runs and 57 RBIs in 109 games between both teams. In 2016, Gatewood spent the whole season with the Timber Rattlers, where he batted .240 with 14 home runs and 64 RBIs in 126 games. He began the 2017 season with the Carolina Mudcats, but was later promoted to the Biloxi Shuckers in August, posting a combined .264 average along with 15 home runs, 62 RBIs, ten stolen bases and a .775 OPS in 134 games between both clubs, and he spent 2018 back with Biloxi, batting .244 with 19 home runs and 59 RBIs in 94 games. On July 24, 2018, while playing for Biloxi, Gatewood was injured running to first base, and it was later revealed that he had torn his ACL in his left knee, requiring season-ending surgery. In 2019, he played with Biloxi, slashing .187/.244/.331 with 13 home runs and 45 RBIs over 94 games. Gatewood did not play at all in 2020 due to the cancellation of the Minor League Baseball season because of the COVID-19 pandemic. He was not included in the Brewers' 60-man player pool and elected free agency on November 2, 2020.

Los Angeles Angels
On April 2, 2021, Gatewood signed a minor league contract with the Los Angeles Angels organization. Gatewood spent the year with the Triple-A Salt Lake Bees, hitting .227/.281/.471 with 28 home runs and 84 RBI in 116 games. He elected free agency after the season on November 7, 2021, but re-signed with the Angels on a new minor league contract on November 16. He elected free agency on November 10, 2022.

References

External links

Living people
1995 births
Arizona League Brewers players
Wisconsin Timber Rattlers players
Helena Brewers players
Carolina Mudcats players
Biloxi Shuckers players
Salt River Rafters players
Glendale Desert Dogs players
People from Clovis, California
Salt Lake Bees players